The Church of St. Gabriel was a parish church under the authority of the Roman Catholic Archdiocese of New York, located at 310 East 37th Street in Murray Hill, Manhattan, New York City, from 1865 to 1939.

History
St. Gabriel's grew out of the Church of St. John the Evangelist on 55th Street. The parish was formed in 1859. Prior to the construction of the church, services were held in a two–story brick building at 306 East 36th Street. The first rector was Rev. William H. Clowry.

Land for the church was donated by Henry J. Anderson, Professor of Mathematics at Columbia College. A parochial school, located at 311 East 36th Street, was organized in 1860. The first floor of the boys school was the chapel, where Sunday Masses for the 1,500-member congregation were held.  St. Gabriel's Church was dedicated on November 12, 1865, by Archbishop John McCloskey. Two of St. Gabriel's priests at the turn of the century later served as Cardinal Archbishop of New York, John Murphy Farley and Patrick Joseph Hayes.

St. Gabriel's Select School (for girls) at 229 East 36th Street was conducted by the Sisters of Charity of Mount Saint Vincent. The Brothers of the Christian Schools ran the boys school.

The parish closed in 1939 to make way for the Queens–Midtown Tunnel linking Manhattan to Queens. The congregation was divided between the Church of the Sacred Hearts of Jesus and Mary and St. Agnes Church. The church building was demolished May 1939. The altar, pews and statues were sent to the newly constructed St. Gabriel's Church in Riverdale, Bronx.

The sacramental records for the now-closed Church of St. Gabriel were transferred to nearby St. Stephen's Church. Early records for the parish school are at the College of Mount Saint Vincent, Riverdale. St. Vartan Park, located between 35th and 36th Streets, was formerly known as St. Gabriel's Park before it was renamed in 1978 for the St. Vartan Armenian Cathedral nearby on Second Avenue.

Architecture
Construction of a church building was delayed because of the American Civil War. The building was designed by architect Henry Engelbert in the Gothic Revival-style. The cornerstone was laid in 1864. The structure was brick with a brownstone façade and brownstone accents. The brownstone was quarried in Belleville, New Jersey. The groined ceiling rested on eighteen columns. The chancel featured a large painting of the Annunciation, by artist Giuseppe Mazzolini. Two side altars were dedicated to the Blessed Virgin and St. Joseph, respectively.

References 

1859 establishments in New York (state)
Buildings and structures demolished in 1939
Closed churches in New York City
Closed churches in the Roman Catholic Archdiocese of New York
Demolished buildings and structures in Manhattan
Demolished churches in New York City
Former Roman Catholic church buildings in New York City
Murray Hill, Manhattan
Religious organizations established in 1859
Roman Catholic churches in Manhattan